The 1988 Grand Prix motorcycle racing season was the 40th F.I.M. Road Racing World Championship season.

Season summary
Eddie Lawson would recapture the championship from Wayne Gardner in a season that witnessed several fierce duels. Two newcomers joined the Grand Prix circuit with Americans Wayne Rainey and Kevin Schwantz each winning races in their first full year. This was Rainey’s debut in the 500s; he had ridden a 250 in 1984 and gotten 1 podium of 12 starts. Alan Cathcart’s pre-season assessment in Cycle News was that “Rainey is a good rider, but he'll never be a great rider. And he'll certainly never be a Randy Mamola.”

The V4 machines used by the factories were extremely powerful and in combination with rigid chassis produced power slides that sometimes caused violent highsides, throwing the riders into the air. Cagiva joined the racing with Randy Mamola as their rider. The first United States Grand Prix in 23 years was held in Monterrey, California.

Sito Pons beat out fellow countryman Juan Garriga for the 250 title winning four races to Garriga's three. Spain's Jorge Martinez captured double championships in the 80 and 125 classes for the Spanish firm Derbi.

1988 Grand Prix season calendar
The following Grands Prix were scheduled to take place in 1988:

Calendar changes
 The United States Grand Prix was added to the calendar after a 23-year absence.
 The Spanish Grand Prix moved from the Jerez to the Jarama circuit.
 The Expo 92 Grand Prix was added as a one-off race to replace the Portuguese Grand Prix which was held in Spain at the Jarama circuit. The venue hosting the Grand Prix was the Jerez circuit.
 The Nations Grand Prix moved from the Monza to the Imola circuit.
 The German Grand Prix moved from the Hockenheimring to the Nürburgring.
 The German Grand Prix was moved back, from 17 to 29 May.
 The Belgian Grand Prix returned after a one-year absence.
 The French Grand Prix moved from the Bugatti Circuit in Le Mans to the Paul Ricard circuit.
 The San Marino Grand Prix was taken off the calendar.
 The Argentine Grand Prix was removed from the calendar because of bad organisation and unsafe track conditions.

Participants

500cc participants

250cc participants

Results and standings

Grands Prix

500cc riders' standings
Scoring system
Points are awarded to the top fifteen finishers. A rider has to finish the race to earn points.

{|
|

250cc standings

125cc standings

80cc standings

References
 Büla, Maurice & Schertenleib, Jean-Claude (2001). Continental Circus 1949-2000. Chronosports S.A. 

Grand Prix motorcycle racing seasons